Erebus purpurata is a moth of the family Erebidae. It is found on the Solomon Islands and New Guinea.

References

Moths described in 1888
Erebus (moth)